Hamisha Daryani Ahuja is a Nigerian actress, film producer,  film director and businesswoman of Indian descent. Ahuja made her directorial and acting debut in the Nollywood-Bollywood cross-cultural film Namaste Wahala.

Early life
Hamisha grew up in Lagos and is a third-generation Nigerian of Indian origin. She attended ACS International School, Cobham, McMaster University, Ontario, and American Academy of Dramatic Arts, New York, where she studied acting. She runs a chain of restaurants in Lagos.

Career
She runs her production company Forever 7 Entertainment and also made her filmmaking debut as a director and actress in the 2021 film Namaste Wahala, a cross-cultural venture of the Nigerian film industry Nollywood and the Indian film industry, Bollywood. The project was a venture to combine elements of both Bollywood and Nollywood film industries, which Ahuja used to create a love story between the two film industries.

She is bringing to the big screen a film starring Nollywood superstar Sola Sobowale, also known as "Toyin Tomato," and Samuel Perry, better known as "Broda Shaggi," in an effort to further promote the partnership between the Nollywood and Bollywood film industries. The director has promised fans that her newest project will surpass her first one, even though other information are still being kept under wraps.

Filmography

Film

Awards and nominations

References

External links

Living people
1985 births
Actresses from Lagos
Businesspeople from Lagos
Nigerian film actresses
Nigerian film directors
Nigerian film producers
Sindhi people
Nigerian people of Sindhi descent
Nigerian people of Indian descent
Actresses in Hindi cinema
Nigerian restaurateurs
McMaster University alumni
American Academy of Dramatic Arts alumni
21st-century Nigerian actresses
21st-century Nigerian businesswomen
21st-century Nigerian businesspeople